Brad Herman is a former American football tight end.  He was born in Peoria, Illinois and moved to Metamora, Illinois in 2002 where he attended Metamora Township High School.

Brad Herman is cousins with Kevin Smuda, a local Montreal flag football star.

School sports
In high school, in addition to playing football, Herman lettered in track.

During college, he played for Iowa Hawkeyes football.

Professional football career
The New England Patriots signed Herman as an undrafted free agent following the 2012 NFL Draft.  Herman tore his Achilles tendon during practice on June 5, was waived, and was put on the injured reserve list on June 11, ending his playing for the season. On April 29, 2013 the Patriots released Herman.

References

1989 births
Living people
New England Patriots players
People from Metamora, Illinois
Players of American football from Illinois
American football tight ends
People from Peoria, Illinois